is a Japanese professional Go player. A former grade school national champion, Uchida became a professional in 2005. He won his first title, the Shinjin-O, in 2008.

Early life
Uchida is a pupil of Morito Obuchi. He was the national champion among sixth grade boys and girls. After winning his first title in 2008, Uchida won two Hiroshima-Aluminum Cup titles in 2009 and 2011. He was promoted to 7 dan in 2011 after qualifying for the 37th Meijin.

Promotion record

Titles and runners-up

References

1988 births
Japanese Go players
Living people